Adovacrius or Eadwacer was a leader who led a group of Saxons based in Gaul in the 5th century. He is mentioned by the historian Gregory of Tours.

Sources
 David Frye: Aegidius, Childeric, Odovacer and Paul. In: Nottingham Medieval Studies. 36, 1992, ISSN 0078-2122, S. 1–14.
 Edward James: The Franks. Blackwell, Oxford u. a. 1988,  (The peoples of Europe).
 Penny MacGeorge: Late Roman Warlords. Oxford University Press, Oxford u. a. 2002,  (Oxford classical monographs).

5th-century Saxon people
Saxon warriors